is a Japanese green tea. It is distinctive from other Japanese green teas because it is roasted in a porcelain pot over charcoal. In general, the base of a hōjicha consists of leaves from the second harvest or after.

Description

Visual appearance 
Dry hōjicha tea leaves are brown wedge-shaped needles. The tea is fired at a high temperature, altering the leaf colour tints from green to reddish-brown.

Infusions have a distinctive clear red appearance and nutty fragrance. Hojicha is sometimes sold in a powdered form and used to make steamed milk drinks.

Taste 
Once infused, hōjicha has a nutty, toasty, sweet flavor. The tea has little to no bitterness.

History 
The process of making hōjicha was discovered in 1920 by accident when a Kyoto merchant had unsaleable bancha. By roasting the bancha, the merchant created a new flavor; hōjicha.

Hōjicha is often made from bancha ( 'common tea'), tea from the last harvest of the season. However, other varieties of hōjicha also exist, including a variety made from sencha and kukicha.

Hōjicha infusions have a light- to reddish-brown appearance and are less astringent. The lower levels of astringency in hōjicha are due to the tea losing catechins during the high-temperature roasting process.

The roasted flavours are extracted and dominate this tea: the roasting replaces the vegetative tones of other varieties of Japanese green tea with a toasty, slightly caramel-like flavour.

The roasting process used to make hōjicha also lowers the amount of caffeine in the tea. Because of its mildness, hōjicha is a popular tea to serve during the evening meal, before sleep, and preferred for children and the elderly.

See also
Bancha
Japanese tea
Kukicha

References 

Green tea
Japanese tea